Shenzhen American International School (SAIS) is an American international school in Shekou, Nanshan District, Shenzhen, Guangdong, China.

SAIS is a PreK-8 school that uses PBL (Project Based Learning) as its teaching philosophy, and is heavily influenced by the High Tech High charter schools in San Diego, the Buck Institute for Education, Edutopia, as well as the Maker Movement in general.

SAIS hosts a school Maker Faire every November, has one of Shekou's first school makerspaces (MakerSAIS), and mounts an Exhibition of Learning each spring.

 it is one of eight schools in Shenzhen designated for children of foreign workers. Initially a China campus of Lee Academy of Maine, it was approved by the Ministry of Education of China in 2005. Due to issues regarding land, by 2008 it had not yet been built.

It was originally in another location in Nanshan District. The school opened in its current Shekou location in January 2014.

See also

Americans in China
 Education in Shenzhen

References

External links
 Shenzhen American International School
  Shenzhen American International School

American international schools in China
International schools in Shenzhen
Private schools in Guangdong